Louis Raphaël I Sako (born 4 July 1948) is a Chaldean Catholic prelate who has served as Patriarch of Baghdad  since 1 February 2013. Pope Francis made him a cardinal on 28 June 2018.

Biography

Early life 
Sako was born in the city of Zakho, Iraq, on 4 July 1948. He comes from an ethnic Assyrian family of the Chaldean Catholic Church that has roots in a religious community that has had a presence in the city of his birth since the 5th century AD.

He completed his early studies in Mosul and then attended the  Dominican-run Saint Jean’s Seminary there. He was ordained a priest on 1 June 1974 and filled his first pastoral assignment at the Cathedral of Mosul until 1979. He then earned a doctorate in Eastern patrology at the Pontifical Oriental Institute. When denied a license to teach because he was only qualified for religious instruction, he earned a second doctorate in history from the Sorbonne in Paris. With this he secured his teaching license and was able to provide religious instruction. From 1997 to 2002 he was rector of the Patriarchal Seminary in Baghdad. He then returned to Mosul and guided the parish of Perpetual Help for a year.

Sako speaks Neo-Aramaic, German, French, English, Italian, and Arabic.

Archeparch
A synod of the bishops of the Chaldean Catholic Church meeting in Baghdad elected Sako Archeparch of Kirkuk on 24 October 2002. Pope John Paul II gave his assent on 27 September 2003. He received his episcopal consecration on 14 November 2003 from his predecessor in Kirkuk, André Sana.

In August 2009, and at the beginning of Ramadan, Sako organized an appeal for national peace, reconciliation and end to violence on the part of more than fifty religious leaders in Kirkuk. He called it "a gesture of closeness to our Muslim brothers. We are all brothers, sons of the same God we must respect and cooperate for the good of the people and our country." The participants included representatives of Ali Sistani and Muqtada al Sadr.

Patriarch 
The Synod of Bishops of the Chaldean Catholic Church, convoked in Rome on 28 January 2013, elected Sako to succeed Emmanuel III Delly as Patriarch of Babylon. He chose Louis Raphael I as his regnal name. Pope Benedict XVI gave his assent to the election on 1 February and granted him ecclesiastica communio (ecclesiastical communion) as required by the canon law for Eastern-rite Catholic churches in recognition of their unity with the wider Catholic church.

In July 2014 Sako led a wave of condemnation for the Sunni Islamists who demanded Christians either convert, submit to their radical rule and pay a religious levy or face death by the sword. In September 2014 Sako said “The U.S. is indirectly responsible for what is going on in Iraq as it said it would ensure democracy and the well-being of the people, but 10 years have passed and on the contrary we have gone backward." He was responding to a question following remarks attributed to him in the local daily Ad-Diyar in which he accused the U.S. of supporting ISIS. Sako had also criticized Muslim countries for lack of support: "Our Muslim neighbours did not help us." He urged Muslim preachers to issue a religious ruling against the killing of all innocent people and said that "Issuing a fatwa preventing Muslims from killing fellow Muslims is not enough."

In 2014, Sako ordered ten priests who had fled Iraq to return there by 22 October; he suspended them when they failed to comply. The priests, all living in the United States, some for as long as twenty years, appealed to Pope Francis for relief from the order. In January 2015, Pope Francis granted them permission to remain in the United States. Sako later renewed his order despite the pope's decision.

In 2015, Sako proposed a "merger" or reunion of his own Chaldean Catholic Church with the Ancient Church of the East and the Assyrian Church of the East to create one united "Church of the East" with a single patriarch in union with the pope. His proposal would have required both his own resignation and that of Mar Addai II, followed by a joint synod of the bishops of all three churches to elect a new patriarch for the reunited Church of the East. (The patriarchate of the Assyrian Church of the East was vacant at the time, following the death of Mar Dinkha IV.) He wrote that "Unity does not mean uniformity, nor the melting of our own church identity into one style, but it maintains unity in diversity and we remain one apostolic universal church, the Oriental Church, that maintains its independence of administration, laws and liturgies, traditions and support." The Assyrian Church of the East respectfully declined this proposal citing "ecclesiological divergences still remaining" and proceeded with its election of a new patriarch.

On 14 November 2015, the Synod of Bishops announced that Pope Francis had named Sako as one of his three appointments to that body's council.

Cardinal
Pope Francis made Sako a cardinal in a consistory on 28 June 2018. Later that year, Pope Francis named him one of the four cardinals to preside over sessions of the Synod of Bishops on Youth in October.

On 6 October 2018 Sako was named a member of the Congregation for the Oriental Churches, on 22 February 2019 a member of the Pontifical Council for Interreligious Dialogue, and on 29 September 2021 a member of the Congregation for Catholic Education.
On 4 January 2022, Pope Francis made him a member of the Council for the Economy.

Honours 
 Defensor Fidei Prize, 2008 
 Pax Christi International Peace Award, 2010

See also 
Cardinals created by Francis
Chaldean Catholics

References

Additional sources

External links 

1948 births
Living people
People from Zakho
Iraqi Eastern Catholics
Pontifical Oriental Institute alumni
Chaldean Catholic Patriarchs of Babylon
Chaldean archbishops
Iraqi archbishops
Iraqi bishops
Iraqi cardinals
21st-century Eastern Catholic archbishops
Cardinals created by Pope Francis
Christian scholars of Islam